William Avila (born 27 October 1956) is a Costa Rican former footballer. He competed in the men's tournament at the 1980 Summer Olympics.

References

External links
 

1956 births
Living people
Costa Rican footballers
Costa Rica international footballers
Olympic footballers of Costa Rica
Footballers at the 1980 Summer Olympics
People from Alajuela
Association football midfielders
A.D. San Carlos footballers
Limón F.C. players